The sisters Hannah Bolton Barlow (born 2 November 1851 in Church End House, Little Hadham, Bishop's Stortford, Hertfordshire, England; died 15 November 1916) and Florence Elizabeth Barlow (born Bishop's Stortford) were artists who painted pottery for Doulton & Co. at their newly-established art pottery studio in Lambeth, London.  Doulton's Lambeth studio allowed the decorators to sign or monogram their work, which allows many pieces to be attributed to individuals, though often more than one person worked on a piece.

Their parents were bank manager Benjamin Barlow (1813–1866) and his wife Hannah (1816–1882). They had seven siblings, two of whom also worked for Doulton, Arthur (1845–1879) who died young and Lucy, who worked in the lesser role of a relief border decorator

Hannah, after studying at Lambeth School of Art, worked for Doulton from 1871, becoming the first female artist to work there. Florence followed, from 1873–1909.  By mutual agreement, Florence specialised in painting flowers and birds, and Hannah in horses and other animals, which were often incised with a blade, the lines being then coloured and often paint added elsewhere. They sometimes worked together on individual pieces.

Hannah died on 15 November 1916 at 46 Binfield Road, Clapham, London. She was buried in Norwood cemetery on 20 November. Her sketchbooks are in the Sir Henry Doulton Gallery, Stoke-on-Trent.

Further reading 
  Rose, P. Hannah Barlow: a Doulton artist (1985) [exhibition catalogue, Christies, 6–10 Aug 1985]

References

External links 

 Work by Hannah Barlow in the V&A Museum
 Work by Florence Barlow in the V&A Museum
 Barlow genealogy

English artists
English pottery
Alumni of the Lambeth School of Art
Burials at West Norwood Cemetery
People from Little Hadham
English women artists
Sisters
Art pottery